Mohammad Al-Salu (born December 21, 1987) is a Jordanian footballer who plays as a defender for Al-Baqa'a.

References

External links 
 
 jo.gitsport.net

Association football defenders
Al-Baqa'a Club players
Al-Ahli SC (Amman) players
Al-Yarmouk FC (Jordan) players
That Ras Club players
Jordanian footballers
1987 births
Living people